Abderrazak Houya (born February 20, 1987, in Monastir) is a Tunisian professional boxer who has held the ABU light welterweight title since 2018. As an amateur he represented his country at the 2012 Olympics at junior welterweight.

He placed second at the 2011 All-Africa Games falling to Richarno Colin.

A second place at the 2012 African Boxing Olympic Qualification Tournament was enough to qualify.
At the 2012 Summer Olympics he beat H.Hajialiyev (AZE).

References

 Record

Living people
1987 births
Light-welterweight boxers
Boxers at the 2012 Summer Olympics
Olympic boxers of Tunisia
Tunisian male boxers
African Boxing Union champions
African Games silver medalists for Tunisia
African Games medalists in boxing
Competitors at the 2011 All-Africa Games
20th-century Tunisian people
21st-century Tunisian people